A nuclear protein is a protein found in the cell nucleus. Proteins are transported inside the nucleus with the help of the nuclear pore complex, which acts a barrier between cytoplasm and nuclear membrane. The import and export of proteins through the nuclear pore complex plays a fundamental role in gene regulation and other biological functions.

References

External links 
http://npd.hgu.mrc.ac.uk/user/about

Cell nucleus